Great Valley Products is a former third-party Amiga hardware supplier. The company was known for CPU accelerators and SCSI host adapters for the Amiga 500 and Amiga 2000 computer series.  The company liquidated itself in July 1995.  A new company GVP-M picked up rights to the Amiga products.

Employee Shareholders
Great Valley Products was owned by its managing employees and their family members. 
 Gerard Bucas – President
 David Ziembicki Sr. – Vice President of Operations
 Jeff Boyer – Vice President of Engineering
 Gregg Garnick – Vice President of Sales
 Erik Quackenbush – Director of Software Development
 George Rapp – Director of Technical Support

GVP A530 Turbo

GVP A530 Turbo released in 1992 is a processor accelerator, disc controller and PC-286 co-system for Amiga 500.

External links

 Great Valley Products – M New company.
 Amiga Hardware Database – Descriptions, photos, drivers and benchmarks of GVP products.
 amiga-hardware.com – Images of GVP's A530 68030 accelerator

References

Amiga